Veli-Matti Kärkkäinen (born 1958) is a Finnish theologian. He is Professor of Systematic Theology at Fuller Theological Seminary. He is an ordained Lutheran minister (ELCA - Evangelical Lutheran Church in America) and an expert on Pentecostal-Charismatic theologies.

Biography 
Veli-Matti Kärkkäinen was born into a Finnish Lutheran family. As a teenager, he would eventually become affiliated to a local Pentecostal church in his homeland. Later in life, he has been ordained as minister of ELCA and serves as part-time associate pastor for Finnish Lutheran Church in California and Texas (under Southwest California ELCA synod).

After receiving a M.Ed. from the University of Jyväskylä, Kärkkäinen pursued a M.A. in theology from Fuller Theological Seminary. He returned to Finland and was ordained as a minister of the Full Gospel Church of Finland, pastoring a local congregation from 1989-1991. In 1991, he moved his family to Thailand and taught at the Full Gospel Bible College in Bangkok. Three years later he return to Finland, becoming president of the Iso Kirja Bible College in Keuruu in 1994. He completed his doctorate at the University of Helsinki in 1998.

Kärkkäinen joined the faculty of Fuller in 2000 as associate professor of systematic theology and became full professor in 2003. Kärkkäinen also serves as Docent of Ecumenics at the University of Helsinki.

Theology 
Kärkkäinen has written textbooks offering global introductions to pneumatology, ecclesiology, and christology.

In 2017 he completed the fifth of his projected five-volume systematic theology series called Constructive Christian Theology for the Church in the Pluralistic World, which engages questions of science and religion, global theology, and dialogue with other religions through comparative theology.

According to Amos Yong, he is "fast becoming one of the more important theologians to be reckoned with in our time."

Writings 
Main works:
 
 
 
 A Constructive Christian Theology for the Pluralistic World (Eerdmans; 5 Volumes):

 Christ and Reconciliation (2013) 
 Trinity and Revelation (2014) 
 Creation and Humanity (2015) 
 Spirit and Salvation (2016) 
 Hope and Community (2017)

References

Living people
Finnish theologians
Pentecostal theologians
Systematic theologians
University of Helsinki alumni
Academic staff of the University of Helsinki
Fuller Theological Seminary alumni
Fuller Theological Seminary faculty
Seminary presidents
1958 births
World Christianity scholars